Eliyahu Ben-Shaul Cohen (‎, ‎; 6 December 1924 – 18 May 1965), commonly known as Eli Cohen, was an Egyptian-born Israeli spy. He is best known for his espionage work in 1961–65 in Syria, where he developed close relationships with the Syrian political and military hierarchy.

Syrian counterintelligence eventually uncovered the spy conspiracy and convicted Cohen under pre-war martial law, sentencing him to death and hanging him publicly in 1965.

Early life and career

Cohen was born in 1924 in Alexandria, Egypt to a devout Mizrahi Jewish and Zionist family. His father had moved there from Aleppo in 1914. A devout Jew, Cohen wore tefillin during prayer, in his youth he planned of becoming a Rabbi with the backup of Moise Ventura (1893-1978), Chief Rabbi of Alexandria but the yeshiva closed down. He studied at Cairo Farouk University. Cohen spoke five languages fluently.

His parents and three brothers left for Israel in 1949, but he remained to finish a degree in electronics and coordinate Jewish and Zionist activities. Prior to the Egyptian revolution of 1952, Cohen was arrested and interrogated over his Zionist activities. He took part in various Israeli covert operations in the country during the 1950s, although the Egyptian government could never prove his involvement in Operation Goshen, an Israeli operation to smuggle Egyptian Jews out of the country and resettle them in Israel due to increasing hostility in Egypt.

Israel's secret police recruited a sabotage unit of Jewish Egyptian citizens in 1955 which attempted to undermine Egypt's relationships with western powers in the "Lavon Affair". The unit bombed unoccupied American and British installations, expecting that this would be considered the work of Egyptians. Egyptian authorities uncovered the spy ring and sentenced two of the members to death. Cohen had aided the unit and was implicated, but they found no link between him and the perpetrators.

Following state-sponsored anti-Semitic attacks on its Jewish communities, many of them fled or were expelled, and Cohen was forced to leave the country in December 1956. He emigrated to Israel with the assistance of the Jewish Agency. The Israel Defense Forces recruited him in 1957 and placed him in military intelligence, where he became a counter-intelligence analyst. His work bored him and he attempted to join the Mossad, but he was offended when the Mossad rejected him, and he resigned from military counter-intelligence. For the next two years, he worked as a filing clerk in a Tel Aviv insurance office.

In 1959, he married Nadia Majald, born circa 1935, an Iraqi-Jewish immigrant and the sister of author Sami Michael. They had three children—Sophie, Irit, and Shai—and the family settled in Bat Yam.

Start with Mossad 

The Mossad recruited Cohen after Director-General Meir Amit, looking for a special agent to infiltrate the Syrian government, came across his name while looking through the agency's files of rejected candidates, after none of the current candidates seemed suitable for the job. For two weeks Cohen was put under surveillance and was judged suitable for recruitment and training. Cohen was then informed that Mossad had decided to recruit him and underwent an intensive six-month course at the Mossad training school. His graduate report stated that he had all the qualities needed to become a katsa, or field agent.

He was then given a false identity as a Syrian businessman who was returning to the country after living in Argentina. To establish his cover, Cohen moved to Buenos Aires in 1961. In Buenos Aires he moved among the Arab community, letting it be known he had large amounts of money to put at the disposal of the Syrian Ba'ath Party. At this time the Ba'ath Party was illegal in Syria but the party seized power in 1963.

Syria

Cohen moved to Damascus in February 1962 under the alias Kamel Amin Thaabet. Mossad had carefully planned the tactics that he was to use in building relationships with high-ranking Syrian politicians, military officials, influential public figures, and the diplomatic community.

Cohen continued his social life as he had in Argentina, spending time in cafes listening to political gossip. He also held parties at his home for high-placed Syrian ministers, businessmen, and others. At these parties,  Cohen  "dispensed free-flowing liquor and prostitutes", and highly placed officials would openly discuss their work and army plans. Cohen would pretend to be drunk to encourage such conversations, to which he paid close attention. He would also lend money to government officials, and many came to him for advice.

Intelligence collected

Cohen provided an extensive amount and wide range of intelligence data for the Israeli Army between 1961 and 1965. He sent intelligence to Israel by radio, secret letters, and occasionally in person; he secretly traveled to Israel three times. His most famous achievement was the tour of the Golan Heights in which he collected intelligence on the Syrian fortifications there. According to an unconfirmed but widely believed story, he feigned sympathy for the soldiers exposed to the sun and had trees planted at every position, placed to provide shade. The Israel Defense Forces were alleged to have used the trees as targeting markers during the Six-Day War, which enabled Israel to capture the Golan Heights in two days.

Cohen made repeated visits to the southern frontier zone, providing photographs and sketches of Syrian positions. He also learned of a secret plan to create three successive lines of bunkers and mortars; the Israel Defense Forces would otherwise have expected to encounter only a single line. Cohen was able to find out that the Syrians planned to divert the Jordan River headwaters in an attempt to deprive Israel of water resources, providing information to Israeli forces that enabled them to destroy the equipment prepared for the task.

It is claimed that the intelligence that Cohen gathered before his arrest was an important factor in Israel's success in the Six-Day War, although some intelligence experts have argued that the information he provided about the Golan Heights fortifications was also readily available from ground and aerial reconnaissance.

A 2018 article published in Newsweek by Ronen Bergman excerpted from Bergman's book Rise and Kill First, says that Eli Cohen located Alois Brunner, a Nazi scientist suspected of living in Syria, and relayed the information to an Israel intelligence unit that later sent letter bombs to Brunner.

Uncovered

Following the 1963 Syrian coup d'état, newly appointed Syrian Intelligence Colonel Ahmed Suidani disliked Cohen and did not trust figures close to the Second Syrian Republic. Cohen expressed fear of discovery to the Mossad on his last secret visit to Israel in November 1964, and he stated that he wished to terminate his assignment in Syria. The purposes of that visit were to pass on intelligence and to enable him to witness the birth of his third child. Despite this, however, Israeli intelligence asked him to return to Syria one more time. Before leaving, Cohen assured his wife it would be his last trip before he returned home permanently.

In January 1965, Syrian officials, who used Soviet-made tracking equipment and were assisted by Soviet experts, increased their efforts to find a high-level spy. They observed a period of radio silence, in the hope that any illegal transmissions could be identified. They successfully detected radio transmissions and were able to triangulate the transmitter. Syrian security services led by Suidani broke into Cohen's apartment on 24 January and caught him in the middle of a transmission to Israel.

Conviction and death sentence

Cohen was found guilty of espionage by a military tribunal and sentenced to death under martial law. He had been repeatedly interrogated and tortured.

Israel staged an international campaign for clemency, hoping to persuade the Syrians not to execute him. Israeli foreign minister Golda Meir led a campaign urging Damascus to consider the consequences of hanging him. Diplomats, prime ministers, parliamentarians, and Pope Paul VI tried to intercede. Meir even appealed to the Soviet Union. The governments of Belgium, Canada, and France tried to persuade the Syrian government to commute the death sentence, but the Syrians refused. Nadia Cohen attempted to appeal for clemency at the Syrian Embassy in Paris but was turned away. Cohen wrote in his final letter on 15 May 1965:
I am begging you my dear Nadia not to spend your time in weeping about some thing already passed. Concentrate on yourself, looking forward for a better future!

Cohen was publicly hanged in the Marjeh Square in Damascus on 18 May 1965. The execution was recorded on 35mm film. On the day of his execution, his last wish to see a rabbi was respected by the prison authorities, and Nissim Indibo, the elderly Chief Rabbi of Syria, accompanied him in the truck. He was also allowed to write a final letter to his wife.

Burial

Syria refused to return Cohen's body to his family in Israel, and his wife Nadia sent a letter to Amin al-Hafiz in November 1965 asking his forgiveness for Cohen's actions and requesting his remains. In February 2007, the Turkish government offered to act as a mediator for their return.

Monthir Maosily, the former bureau chief of Hafez Al-Assad, claimed in August 2008 that the Syrians had buried him three times to stop the remains from being taken back to Israel via a special operation. Syrian authorities have repeatedly denied family requests for the remains. Cohen's brothers Abraham and Maurice led a campaign to return his remains; Maurice died in 2006, and Nadia now leads it.

In 2016, a Syrian group calling itself "Syrian art treasures" posted a video on Facebook showing Cohen's body after his execution. No film or video was previously known to exist of the execution. The press announced on 5 July 2018 that Cohen's wristwatch had been retrieved from Syria. His widow mentioned that the watch was up for sale months earlier, and Mossad managed to capture it. Mossad director Yossi Cohen presented it to Cohen's family in a ceremony, and it is currently on display at Mossad headquarters.

Legacy

Cohen has become a national hero in Israel, and many streets and neighborhoods have been named for him. Prime Minister Menachem Begin, Defense Minister Ezer Weizmann, Chief of Staff Mordechai Gur, and several Mossad operatives all attended his son's Bar Mitzvah in 1977. A memorial stone has been erected to Cohen in the Garden of the Missing Soldiers in Mount Herzl, Jerusalem.

John Shea played Cohen in the television film The Impossible Spy (1987), and Sacha Baron Cohen played him in the Netflix miniseries The Spy (2019).

The Israeli settlement Eliad on the Golan Heights is named for him.

References

External links

 Cohen's widow asks for his remains to be returned Israel National News
 PM's speech at the ceremony marking 40 years since the death of Eli Cohen Israel Ministry of Foreign Affairs
Our man in Damascus: Eli Cohen of blessed memory, Exhibition in the IDF & Defense Establishment Archives 
 The Eli Cohen Files
 Eli Cohen, moments after the execution (part 1)
 Eli Cohen, moments after the execution (part 2), containing footage from the Associated Press archives, 1965
 Eli Cohen Mossad Spy @J-grit.com

Israeli Mizrahi Jews
Egyptian Jews
Egyptian emigrants to Israel
Egyptian people convicted of spying for Israel
Israeli expatriates in Syria
Executed spies
Executed Israeli people
Israeli people executed abroad
People executed by Syria by hanging
1924 births
1965 deaths
Israeli torture victims
Executed Egyptian people
Publicly executed people
People of the Mossad